The Last Tunnel may refer to:

The Last Tunnel (1987 film), a Mexican film from 1987
The Last Tunnel (2004 film), a Canadian film from 2004